The Respublica Party is a political party in Kazakhstan, which was officially registered on 18 January 2023.

History 
An agricultural producer, the head of the Olzha Agro company, Aidarbek Khodjanazarov, became the chairman of the party. The co-chairs are entrepreneurs Syrymbek Tau, Ruslan Berdenov, Maxim Baryshev, Dinara Shukizhanova, Kuanysh Shonbai, Beibit Alibekov and Nurlan Koyanbaev.

The creation of the party was announced in August 2022. On 18 January 2023, the Respublica party received registration documents.

On 25 January, the first regional branch was opened in the Kostanay Region. On 27 January, all 20 regional divisions of the party received registration.

Ideology 
The aim of the party is to create levers of influence on the country's politics, so that every citizen of Kazakhstan feels involvement in political, social and economic changes.

Opinions 
Kazakh political scientists Rakhim Oshakbaev and Gaziz Zhaparov positively assessed the party's chances of winning in the snap Kazakh parliamentary elections, which are scheduled for 19 March 2023.

References 

Political parties in Kazakhstan
Political parties established in 2023